The Cardiff Bay Development Corporation was set up by the United Kingdom Government on 3 April 1987 to redevelop one sixth of the area of Cardiff to create Cardiff Bay.

Objectives
The Secretary of State for Wales, Nicholas Edwards set out the CBDC's mission statement as:

To put Cardiff on the international map as a superlative maritime city which will stand comparison with any such city in the world, thereby enhancing the image and economic well-being of Cardiff and Wales as a whole.

The five main aims and objectives were:
 To promote development and provide a superb environment in which people will want to live, work and play.
 To re-unite the City of Cardiff with its waterfront.
 To bring forward a mix of development which would create a wide range of job opportunities and would reflect the hopes and aspirations of the communities of the area.
 To achieve the highest standard of design and quality in all types of development and investment.
 To establish the area as a recognized centre of excellence and innovation in the field of urban regeneration.

The CBDC was chiefly responsible for building the Cardiff Bay Barrage, the new shopping and housing developments across the old docks in the 1990s and the Roald Dahl Plass development.

Achievements
During the CBDC's lifetime  of non-housing development and 5,780 housing units were built. Around 31,000 new jobs were created and some £1.8 billion of private finance was invested. About  of derelict land was reclaimed.

The Chairman was Sir Geoffrey Inkin. The first Chief Executive was Barry Lane, who was later succeeded by Michael Boyce.

The CBDC was dissolved on 31 March 2000. The Cardiff Harbour Authority took over the CBDC's management of the barrage, the Inland Bay and the Rivers Taff and Ely on 1 April 2000. 

An evaluation of the regeneration of Cardiff Bay published in 2004 concluded that the project had "reinforced the competitive position of Cardiff" and "contributed to a massive improvement in the quality of the built environment". However, the regeneration project had been less successful in generating employment. The evaluation concluded that "the overall outcome, while representing a major achievement and massive step forward, falls short of the original vision."

References

Further reading

External links
Cardiff Harbour Authority

Economy of Cardiff
History of Cardiff
Organizations established in 1987
Organizations disestablished in 2000
Organisations based in Cardiff
Defunct public bodies of the United Kingdom
Redevelopment projects in Cardiff
Development Corporations of the United Kingdom
1987 establishments in Wales
2000 disestablishments in Wales